The 2015 S.League was the 20th season since the establishment of the S.League, the top-flight Singaporean professional league for association football clubs. The league was also known as the Great Eastern Yeo's S.League due to sponsorship reasons. Warriors FC were the defending champions.

Changes from 2014 
The league underwent a number of changes in its 20th season in order to increase its competitiveness:
 The number of clubs was reduced from 12 to 10, with the withdrawal of Tanjong Pagar United due to financial problems, and the merger of Woodlands Wellington and Hougang United.
 The league returned to a three-round format used from 2001 to 2011.
 The foreign player quota remained at five per club but incentives were given to those who signed an under-21 player.
 The passing time for the mandatory 2.4 km fitness test was lowered from 10 mins to 9 mins 45 s.

A new rule on age restrictions – a maximum of five players aged 30 and above and a minimum of three under-25 players for clubs with a 22-man squad, a maximum of four players aged 30 and above and a minimum of two under-25 players for clubs with a 20-man squad – was later reversed.

Teams 
A total of 10 teams contested the league. Tanjong Pagar United withdrew from the league due to financial problems, while Woodlands Wellington merged into Hougang United. Albirex Niigata (S), DPMM FC and Harimau Muda are invited foreign clubs from Japan, Brunei and Malaysia respectively.

Stadiums and locations

Personnel and sponsoring
Note: Flags indicate national team as has been defined under FIFA eligibility rules. Players may hold more than one non-FIFA nationality.

Managerial changes

Foreigners 
Players name in bold indicates the player is registered during the mid-season transfer window.

 Albirex Niigata (S) and Harimau Muda B are an all-Japanese and all-Malaysian team respectively and do not hire any foreigners.

League table

Results

Round 1

Round 2

Round 3

Statistics

Top scorers

Hat-tricks

S-League Awards Night Winners

References

External links 
 Official site

Singapore Premier League seasons
1
Sing
Sing